The New Minster Liber Vitae is a confraternity book produced in Winchester, in southern England, in 1031. It records the names of visitors to the New Minster, Winchester and contains other information too, as well as a celebrated image of King Cnut the Great and Queen Emma of Normandy (below right). 

 

The original manuscript is now kept in the British Library in London, as Stowe MS 944.  It and the Durham Liber Vitae are the only surviving Anglo-Saxon confraternity books.

On folio 29, a later writer has added the names of King Edward the Confessor, Queen Edith and the aetheling Edgar. In a recent article, Tom Licence has argued this list shows that Edgar was considered as King Edward's legitimate heir before Edward's death in 1065.

References

Editions

 (facsimile)

Further reading
 S. Keynes, 'The Liber Vitae of the New Minster, Winchester', in The Durham Liber Vitae and its context, ed. D. Rollason et al. (Woodbridge, 2004), pp.149-164
 'The New Minster Liber Vitae', Medieval Manuscripts Blog http://blogs.bl.uk/digitisedmanuscripts/2011/06/the-new-minster-liber-vitae.html

1031 establishments in Europe
11th-century manuscripts
Later Anglo-Saxon illuminated manuscripts
Stowe manuscripts